AVANI Hotels & Resorts is a hotel and resort chain with 34 properties in over 15 countries. The majority of the properties are based in Thailand, whereas a smaller number of properties are established in a few other countries. Avani is a part of the hospitality chain Minor Hotels. The group's portfolio, as of 2021, includes 34 properties, mainly across Thailand, Sri Lanka, Vietnam, the United Arab Emirates and a few properties in other parts of the world.

AVANI Hotels and Resorts was launched in 2012 with their first property in Bentota. In 2010, Minor Hotels acquired 80% stake in Serendib Leisure Kalutara, which is now known as AVANI Kalutara Resort.

Recent awards

2015
 Mozambique's Leading Hotel 2015 – AVANI PEMBA BEACH HOTEL & SPA 
 Indian Ocean's Leading New Resort 2015 – AVANI SEYCHELLES BARBARONS RESORT & SPA 
 Best Luxury Design Hotel at World Luxury Hotel Awards – AVANI BENTOTA RESORT & SPA

2016
 One of Asia's Top Emerging Hotels by Now Travel Asia – AVANI RIVERSIDE BANGKOK

2017
 Recognised as an Extraordinary Place for Unique Spa Experiences by Forbes – AVANI QUY NHON RESORT & SPA

Corporate social responsibility 
 Member of the Heinecke Foundation – Awarding Scholarships to Students  
 Participates in the Earth Hour initiatives to support local charities 
 Supporting the environment by ending the use of plastic straws

Partnerships  
  Emirates Airlines
 Member of  Aeroflot Bonus
 Airlink
 Asia Miles
 Bangkok Airways
 Ethiopian Airlines
 Etihad Guest
 Oman Air
 Philippine Airlines
  Qatar Privilege Club
 Singapore Airlines
 TAP Air Portugal
 Royal Orchid Plus
 Affilired Travel Performance Agency

References

External links

2012 establishments in Thailand
Hotel chains in Thailand
Hotel chains